Judith Mok is a Dutch soprano, author and poet, who lives in Ireland and has released novels and many articles in English.

Biography
Judith Mok was born  in Bergen, North Holland. 
After graduating from the Royal Conservatory of The Hague at a very young age, Mok won French and Dutch State Grants to study in Vienna under Christa Ludwig and her mother Eugenia. In Paris she studied French repertoire with Pierre Bernac and Noémie Pérugia. She participated in masterclasses for contemporary music by Cathy Berberian, John Cage, Karlheinz Stockhausen and Dorothy Dorow. She was also chosen for masterclasses by Elisabeth Schwarzkopf. Prizes followed at the international vocalist competitions in Den Bosch and Barcelona.

Her lieder, oratorio and opera repertoire led to appearances at numerous festivals including Salzburg, Edinburgh, Paris and the Holland Festival. She has worked in North and South America and in almost every country in Europe.

Having dedicated part of her career to contemporary music, composers such as Louis Andriessen, Gerardo Gandini, Bob Zimmerman and Jeff Hamburg have written works for her which have been recorded on CD. She was also chosen by the Oscar-winning Chinese composer Tan Dun to perform his works in several countries. She has worked with contemporary music ensembles like the Nieuw Ensemble, and l'ensemble Contrechamps in Geneva.

Mok sang the opening of the Musica Festival in Strasbourg (Il canto sospeso by Luigi Nono), in addition to creating her own a cappella recital. Irish composer Elaine Agnew wrote a piece Snowhole for her and members of the Irish Chamber Orchestra, which was performed at the National Concert Hall, Dublin. Recently she appeared for the New York openair concerts.

Her love for chamber music led to Mok singing duos with the mezzo-soprano Susanna Moncayo and the pianist Fernando Perez. Together they have toured in Europe and the Americas. They have recorded two CDs of this unique repertoire. They were also invited to give a gala concert in the Concertgebouw in Amsterdam as a wedding present for the Dutch crown prince Willem Alexander and his wife Máxima.

More recently Mok widened her musical experience by performing with various rock artists. She has been working for years on her extended vocal techniques, experimenting with her voice and presentation. This also led to her deepening her interest for Sephardic (Jewish) music. Her love and involvement with literature and her desire to combine this with music led to the creation of her one-woman show “Molly Says No” about Molly Bloom, the heroine of J Joyce’s Ulysses, which has toured worldwide from India to the United States (Lincoln Center, The Academy Hollywood. Mok’s books of poetry, novels and short stories have been published in Dutch and English, for which she received various awards and nominations. She has also sung and acted in several feature films, including the award-winning Goodnight, Vienna

External links
Judith Mok's Website
Mok's most recent poetry collection with Salmon Poetry
Mok's biography on The Parlour Review
Mok's Show, "Molly Says No" reviewed at vulgo.ie
 Mok interviewed at The New Obsessive

Living people
People from Bergen, North Holland
21st-century Dutch novelists
Dutch women novelists
Dutch women poets
Dutch operatic sopranos
Royal Conservatory of The Hague alumni
21st-century Dutch women writers
Year of birth missing (living people)